Razorback is a colloquial term in the United States and Australia for a type of feral pig.

Razorback may also refer to:

 The fin whale

Entertainment
 Razorback (novel), a novel by American author Peter Brennan
 Razorback (film), a 1984 Australian horror film based on the novel
 Razorback (band), a Filipino rock band
 Razorback (comics), Buford Hollis, a comic book character introduced in the pages of Spectacular Spider-Man in 1977
 The Razorbacks, a Canadian rockabilly band

Sports
 Arkansas Razorbacks, the names of college sports teams at the University of Arkansas in Fayetteville, Arkansas
 West Sydney Razorbacks, an Australian professional basketball team
 Rüsselsheim Razorbacks, a defunct American football Team from Rüsselsheim, Germany

Other
 Razorback, New South Wales, a locality in Australia
 Razorback, a hiking trail on Mount Feathertop in the Australian state of Victoria

 USS Razorback, a World War 2 submarine
 Razorback2, a former server on the eDonkey filesharing network
 Dean Razorback, a guitar
 Early models of Republic P-47 Thunderbolt fighter aircraft
 A beer by Ringwood Brewery
 A worker who loads and unloads train cars for a circus